Pujari Ki Dhani is a village in the Jhunjhunu district of Rajasthan, India. It is part of Shekhawati. It is a Grampanchayat. Pujari Ki Dhani is Located in East of Nawalgarh nearby Gothara.

The village have one secondary government school and two private schools. the village also has one govt hospital near bala ji temple.  The chief occupation is agriculture and wood craft works as well as government services. Sunil Kumar Sain is the first person of this village who joined the Indian Navy in Jul 2009. There after Anil garodiya joined the Navy. Most of the Jangir families living in the centre of the village and doing jobs in outside the state or country. Pari Hair Saloon located near Balaji temple is famous saloon in this village.

Villages in Jhunjhunu district